This is a list of monuments that are classified by the Moroccan ministry of culture around Meknes.

Monuments and sites in Meknes 

|}

References 

Meknes
Meknes